Katya Mandoki is a scholar of philosophy, author and experimental artist born in Mexico City (1947) from Jewish Hungarian immigrant parents.

Biography 
Mandoki pioneered the systematic research of Everyday Aesthetics coining the term "Prosaics" (1994) for this subfield of Aesthetics. In her book Everyday Aesthetics, the first extended treatment of this subject, she opens up the study of aesthetics – traditionally confined to art and beauty – to encompass all those aspects involving  sensibility in common experience  using the human body as a starting point for this analysis. Her work covers not only the positive aspect of aesthetics but also its negative side such as cruelty and abuse upon someone's sensibility, never before thought of in those terms.  She stresses the danger of political manipulation of sensibility  illustrated  by the propagandistic use of aesthetics  specifically during the Nazi regime. From Mandoki's work on the negativity of aesthetics Arnold Berleant takes off to analyze this issue in relation to terrorism. The subfield of everyday aesthetics is so fertile that it has been followed and enriched by a number of contemporary aestheticians.

Mandoki has published eight books on this topic, the most recent presenting and developing the concept of bio-aesthetics  that traces sensibility not only in humans but in the most elemental creatures from an evolutionary perspective. She is a member of the Mexican Academy of Sciences, of the National System of Researchers (SNI), and Founder and Honorary Member of the Mexican Association of Aesthetics (AMEST) serving as President from 2007–2011. She has been professor of aesthetics and semiotics at Metropolitan Autonomous University (UAM) in Mexico where she established and chaired postgraduate specialization studies in Aesthetics, Semiotics and Theory of Culture, has taught postgraduate level at National Autonomous University of Mexico (UNAM) and given courses for Instituto Nacional de Bellas Artes and Universidad Iberoamericana. She received the National Prize for Arts in experimental work (1982, 1985) by the INBA, the  Prize for Academic Research by UAM (1995, 2007, 2015) and participated in various individual and collective artwork exhibitions at museums and galleries such as Palacio de Bellas Artes on several occasions. Her monumental sculpture Histogram on the distribution of income in Mexico can be visited at the Library Plaza in the Xochimilco Campus of UAM. Mandoki published more than 150 articles on aesthetics and semiotics and presented papers and lectures in 20 countries. Presently, Mandoki works on the International Association of Aesthetics' executive committee (IAA), at the international advisory board of the International Institute of Applied Aesthetics, Finland, and on the international editorial board of various academic journals such as Contemporary Aesthetics, Cultural Politics and Environment, Land, Society, Architectonics.

Books 
 El indispensable exceso de la estética. (México: Siglo XXI editores, 2013) .
 Everyday aesthetics: prosaics, the play of culture, and social identities. (Aldershot: Ashgate, 2007) .
 La construcción estética del Estado y de la identidad nacional: Prosaica III. (México: Siglo XXI editores, 2007) .
 Prácticas estéticas e identidades sociales: Prosaica II. (México: Siglo XXI editores, 2007) .
 Estética cotidiana y juegos de la cultura: Prosaica I. (México: Siglo XXI editores, 2006) . 
 Estética y comunicación: de acción, pasión y seducción. (Bogotá: Grupo Editorial Norma 2006) .
 Prosaica; introducción a la estética de lo cotidiano. (México: Grijalbo, 1994) .

References

External links 
 
 International Association of Aesthetics
 Histogram at Metropolitan Autonomous University
 Asociación Mexicana de Estudios en Estética
 Academia Mexicana de Ciencias
 Ashgate Publishing
 Siglo Veintiuno Editores
 Editorial Grijalbo

Mexican women writers
Mexican women artists
Writers from Mexico City
Artists from Mexico City
Mexican people of Hungarian descent
Mexican people of Hungarian-Jewish descent
1947 births
Living people
Academic staff of Universidad Autónoma Metropolitana